Jimmy Thackery (born May 19, 1953, Pittsburgh, Pennsylvania, United States) is an American blues singer, guitarist and songwriter.

Career
Thackery spent fourteen years as part of The Nighthawks, the Washington, D.C. based blues and roots rock ensemble. After leaving the Nighthawks in 1986, Thackery toured under his own name.

Born in Pittsburgh and raised in Washington, Thackery co-founded The Nighthawks with Mark Wenner in 1972 and went on to record over twenty albums with them. In 1986 he began touring with The Assassins, a six-piece original blues, rock and R&B ensemble which he had previously helped start as a vacation band when The Nighthawks took one of their rare breaks. Originally billed as Jimmy Thackery and The Assassins, the band toured the U.S. Northeast, Mid-Atlantic, South, and Texas regions. The Assassins released a variety of recordings on the Seymour record label, two on vinyl (No Previous Record and Partners in Crime) and the 1989 CD Cut Me Loose.

In the wake of the Assassins 1991 break-up, Thackery has been leading a trio, Jimmy Thackery and the Drivers, whose early recordings were for the San Francisco, California based Blind Pig Records. In 2002 Thackery released, We Got It, his first album on Telarc and in 2006, In the Natural State with Earl and Ernie Cate on Rykodisc. In 2007, he released Solid Ice again with The Drivers. His latest album, Spare Keys, was released in 2016.

Discography
 1985: Sideways in Paradise (first pressing, Seymour no catalog #) (while still with The Nighthawks, this album with John Mooney)
 1992: Empty Arms Motel
 1993: Sideways in Paradise (with John Mooney)
 1994: Trouble Man
 1995: Wild Night Out
 1996: Drive To Survive
 1996: Partners in Crime (with Tom Principato)
 1998: Switching Gears
 2000: Sinner Street
 2000: That's It! (with David Raitt)
 2002: We Got It
 2002: Whiskey Store" with Tab Benoit)
 2003: Guitar (Instrumental/Compilation)
 2003: True Stories 2004: Whiskey Store Live (with Tab Benoit)
 2005: Healin' Ground 2006: In the Natural State (with the Cate Brothers)
 2007: Solid Ice 2008: Live! 2008 2008: Inside Tracks 2010: Live in Detroit 2011: Feel the Heat 2014: Wide Open 2016: Spare Keys''

See also
The Nighthawks

References

External links
Official website

1953 births
Living people
American blues guitarists
American male guitarists
American blues singers
Musicians from Pittsburgh
Singers from Washington, D.C.
Singers from Pennsylvania
Guitarists from Washington, D.C.
Guitarists from Pennsylvania
20th-century American guitarists
20th-century American male musicians